Frederick Augustus Woodard (February 12, 1854 – May 8, 1915) was a Democratic U.S. Representative from North Carolina between 1893 and 1897.

Born near Wilson, North Carolina, Woodard attended private schools in Wilson County and studied law under Richmond Mumford Pearson, Chief Justice of the Supreme Court of North Carolina. He was admitted to the bar in 1873 and practiced law in his hometown of Wilson.

He rose in business to become vice-president of the First National Bank of Wilson, and was elected as a Democrat to the 54th United States Congress in 1892. Unsuccessful in his 1896 bid for re-election, Woodard returned to the practice of law and died in Wilson in 1915. He is buried there in Maplewood Cemetery.

External links

1854 births
1915 deaths
North Carolina lawyers
People from Wilson County, North Carolina
Democratic Party members of the United States House of Representatives from North Carolina
19th-century American politicians
19th-century American lawyers